Let the Game Begin is a 2010 American romantic comedy from Twisted Light Productions, directed by Amit Gupta. The film stars CSI: Miami actor Adam Rodriguez and Stephen Baldwin. The film was released in Australia on May 5, 2010, and was released in other countries in 2010 and 2011.

Cast
 Adam Rodriguez as Rowan
Sid Curtis as Young Rowan
 Stephen Baldwin as David Carroll
 Lisa Ray as Eva
 Michael Madsen as Dr. Turner
 Diora Baird as Kate
 Thomas Ian Nicholas as Tripp
 Jesse Jane as Temptation
 Jennifer Rhodes as Hope
 Lochlyn Munro as Gary Johnson
 Ken Davitian as Eric Banks
 Natasha Henstridge as Angela
 James Avery as Hanley
 Zan Perrion as himself
 Caroline Neron as Samantha
 James Matador as Matador, PUA
 Jasmine Dustin as Nadine, Wing Woman
 Lisa Jay as Scarlet, Wing Woman
 Cristina Rosato as Francine, Social Proof
 Ashleigh Harrington as Anna, Dancer

Development
The film was cast in Los Angeles and Quebec in 2008. The script was written by the director and producer Amit Gupta, and after a year of writing the script, the film started production in early 2008. Filming was done in 2008 and picked up again in February 2010 to finish last scenes needed by the distribution company. Filming was done in Los Angeles, Las Vegas, Montreal, and Philadelphia.
International release was in April 2010.  U.S and Canada release is expected in 2011.

References

External links
 
 

American screwball comedy films
2010 romantic comedy films
American chase films
2010 films
Films shot in Los Angeles
2010s English-language films
2010s American films